Valeria Simoncini (born 1966) is an Italian researcher in numerical analysis who works as a professor in the mathematics department at the University of Bologna. Her research involves the computational solution of equations involving large matrices, and their applications in scientific computing. She is the chair of the SIAM Activity Group on Linear Algebra.

Education and career
Simoncini earned a degree from the University of Bologna in 1989, became a visiting scholar at the University of Illinois at Urbana–Champaign from 1991 to 1993, and completed her PhD at the University of Padua in 1994. After working at CNR from 1995 to 2000, she returned to Bologna as an associate professor in 2000, and was promoted to full professor in 2010.

Book
With Antonio Navarra, she is the author of the book A Guide to Empirical Orthogonal Functions for Climate Data Analysis (Springer, 2010).

Recognition
Simoncini was a second-place winner of the Leslie Fox Prize for Numerical Analysis in 1997.
In 2014 she was elected as a fellow of the Society for Industrial and Applied Mathematics "for contributions to numerical linear algebra".
She was named to the 2021 class of fellows of the American Mathematical Society "for contributions to computational mathematics, in particular to numerical linear algebra". In 2023, she was elected to serve on the SIAM Council.

References

External links
Home page

1966 births
Living people
Italian mathematicians
Women mathematicians
University of Bologna alumni
University of Padua alumni
Academic staff of the University of Bologna
Numerical analysts
Fellows of the Society for Industrial and Applied Mathematics
Fellows of the American Mathematical Society